Senadora Eunice Michiles Airport  is the airport serving São Paulo de Olivença, Brazil. It is named after Eunice Michiles, a Brazilian politician.

Airlines and destinations
No scheduled flights operate at this airport.

Access

See also

List of airports in Brazil

References

External links

Airports in Amazonas (Brazilian state)